Friedrich Fritz Dirtl (1928–1956) was an international speedway rider from Austria.

Speedway career 
Dirtl was a two times champion of Austria after winning the Austrian Individual Speedway Championship in 1949 and 1951. He was also a six times Longtrack champion of Austria.

Dirtl was tragically killed competing in the 1956 Individual Speedway World Championship, at the Continental final stage. He was involved in a crash with fellow Austrian rider Josef Kamper and then fell into the path of Mieczysław Połukard.

See also
 Rider deaths in motorcycle racing

References 

1928 births
1956 deaths
Austrian speedway riders
Sportspeople from Vienna
Motorcycle racers who died while racing
Sport deaths in Germany